Non sequitur may refer to:

 Non sequitur (fallacy), an invalid argument whose conclusion is not supported by its premises
 Non sequitur (literary device), an irrelevant, often humorous comment to a preceding topic or statement
 Non Sequitur (comic strip), a comic strip by Wiley Miller
 "Non Sequitur" (Star Trek: Voyager), an episode of Star Trek: Voyager

See also
 Sequitur algorithm, a recursive algorithm

Latin logical phrases
Latin philosophical phrases
Latin words and phrases